Rose Champion de Crespigny (born Annie Rose Charlotte Key; 9 November 1859 – 10 February 1935) was an English artist and author, who published many novels as Mrs Philip Champion de Crespigny.

Rose was the daughter of Admiral Sir Astley Cooper Key (who later changed the surname to Cooper-Key) and his wife, Lady Charlotte Lavinia (née McNeil). She was born 9 November 1859 in Kensington, and she was baptised 15 December 1859 at St John's, Notting Hill.

As an artist, her paintings tended toward landscape; her writing, after early forays into genealogical and local history, soon settled into popular fiction. Her work was described in a contemporary review as having "a certain graceful facility". She was a leading member of the Ridley Art Club, the Lyceum Club in Piccadilly, and of the British College of Psychic Science.

Rose married Philip Augustus Champion de Crespigny (1850-1912), a Royal Navy officer and son of Sir Claude William Champion de Crespigny, 3rd Baronet, on 1 October 1878 in Westminster. They had four children, including Frederick Philip Champion de Crespigny (1884–1947), who inherited the baronetcy, as the 7th Baronet, the year before his death:

Select bibliography
Key to the Roll of the Huguenots Settled in the United Kingdom (1884)
The Roll of the Highland Clans of Scotland (1889)
The New Forest; its traditions, inhabitants and customs (1895)
From Behind the Arras (1902)
The Mischief of a Glove (1903)
The Rose Brocade (1905)
The Grey Domino (1906)
The Spanish Prisoner (1907)
My Cousin Cynthia, and Others (1908)
The Coming of Aurora (1909)
The Valley of Achor (1910)
The Five of Spades (1912)
The Mark (1912)
Hester and I (1915)
Stories of To-day and Yesterday (1917)
The Moving Finger (1919) 
The Shears of Atropos (1919) 
The Villa on the Borderive Road (1919) 
The Witness in the Wood (1919) 
The Case of Mr. Fitzgordon (1919) 
The Voice (1919) 
The Mind of a Woman (1922)
The Valley of Orchids (1923)
Tangled Evidence (1924), basis of film Tangled Evidence in 1934
The Missing Piece (1927)
The Dark Sea (1927)
Straws in the Wind (1928)
The Eye of Nemesis (1931)
Glimpses into Infinity (1931)
A Case for the C.I.D. (1933)
The Riddle of the Emeralds (1934)
This World and Beyond (1934)

References

1859 births
1935 deaths
English women artists
English women novelists
English painters
20th-century English novelists
20th-century English women writers
People from Kensington
Writers from London
Artists from London